Max Lemke (born 2 December 1996) is a German sprint canoeist.

He participated at the 2018 ICF Canoe Sprint World Championships.

References

External links

1996 births
German male canoeists
Living people
ICF Canoe Sprint World Championships medalists in kayak
Canoeists at the 2015 European Games
Canoeists at the 2019 European Games
European Games medalists in canoeing
European Games silver medalists for Germany
Olympic canoeists of Germany
Canoeists at the 2020 Summer Olympics
Medalists at the 2020 Summer Olympics
Olympic medalists in canoeing
Olympic gold medalists for Germany